Salem Masadeh (born in the 1930s) is a lawyer and a former minister in the Jordanian government.

Early life and education
Masadeh completed his high school in Jordan and graduated from Damascus University in 1954 with a law degree.

Career
Masadeh started his career as a judge  in Jordan (1958-1970). He then became the governor of Amman and the deputy of the minister of Interior Affairs (1970-1972).

Masadeh served as Minister of Justice( 1972-1974) in Ahmad Louzi's government, and in the following government he was minister of Finance (1974-1976). He then served briefly in Mudar Badran's first government. In the next three years, he worked in the private sector as a lawyer. 

In 1979, Masadeh was asked to serve as the minister of Finance again. After prime minister Shareef Abed El Hameed Sharaf died three years later, Masadeh continued as the finance minister under Mudar's Badran's third administration until 1984. 

Masadeh returned to the private sector for five years. In 1989, an economic crisis hit Jordan, after Zaid al-Rifai's government. Masadeh was called back into Zaid ibn Shaker's government as vice prime minister, and minister of Interior affairs. Eight months later, the prime minister resigned and Mudar Badran took office as the prime minister. Masadeh was assigned again as the vice Prime minister and minister of Interior Affairs for the last time.

After retiring from the government, Masadeh served as a member of the Jordanian Senate.  He also became a board of trustees  member of the Islamic Bank, Jordan Steel, and Yarmouk University.

References

External links
Profile at the Jordanian Senate
http://www.jordanislamicbank.com/?427dacca3edd8203f5aceefbb6656d2efc545ea3cf

Year of birth missing (living people)
Living people